Avery is the debut studio album by South African rapper and singer Emtee, released on 4 December 2015, through Ambitiouz Entertainment.

Artwork 
Album art was designed by Mpho Ngakane.

Commercial performance 

As of 22 January 2016, the album peaked at the top of the South African Hip hop / Rap iTunes Chart. The single "Roll Up" entered the top 3 of the South African Hip hop / Rap Singles Chart on iTunes.

As of  July  2016, the album has since been certified platinum by RISA for selling over 40,000 units.

First Single From Avery Roll Up debuted at no. 3 on the SA Top 100 chart topping for 5 weeks in a row with that said Roll Up has been certified 3× Platinum by RiSA. Second single which is the remix which features SA Hip Hop heavyweight AKA and Nigerian star WizKid put released as Roll Up(Re-Up) peaked at no. 2 on the SA Top 100 chart charting in the top ten for 7 weeks until dropping to no.13 in its eighth week on the chart. Roll Up(Re-Up) has been since certified Platinum by RiSA.The Third single from Avery Pearl Thusi debuted at no.7 on the SA Top 100 chart and peaked at no.1 for 3 weeks in a row and has become one of the best songs in SA Hip Hop History. Pearl Thusi has since been certified Platinum by RiSA becoming Emtee's third Certified single Since Roll Up. Ngeke which features South African rapper, Fifi Cooper has since peaked at no.13 on the SA Top 100 chart. A promotional single titled Mama was released on mother's day to honour all mothers, and has since peaked at no.9 and was certified Gold by RiSA.The fifth single from Avery titled We Up was one of the biggest songs in SA in 2016 and is still the biggest song to ever drop in SA Hip Hop History. We Up peaked at no.7 on the SA TOP 100 becoming Emtee's fifth Top Ten Single and has since been certified Platinum by RiSA.

Track listing

Accolades

Avery won Best Hip Hop Album at Metro FM Music Awards and also won Best Rap Album at South African Music Awards.

Certifications

References 

2015 debut albums
Emtee albums
Ambitiouz Entertainment albums
Albums produced by Tweezy